The Sandsvatn is the largest lake on the island of Sandoy and the third largest in the Faroe Islands, measuring 0.8 km2 with a depth of 5 metres. It is situated in a valley between Skopun and Sandur, just north of the latter on Road 30. At the northern end of the lake are the island's school centre and a copse (plantation) which was badly damaged by a 1988 hurricane.

The lake used to be rich in trout, lake trout and salmon. It has been called an "interesting" lake for birdwatching.

References

External links

Sportsfishing in the Faroe Islands

Lakes of the Faroe Islands
Sandoy